The second Bagmati Provincial Assembly was elected by the 2022 provincial elections on 20 November 2022. 110 members were elected to the assembly, 66 of whom were elected through direct elections and 44 of whom were elected through the party list proportional representation system. The first session on the assembly commenced from 2 January 2023.

Leaders

Officers 

 Speaker of the Assembly: Hon. Bhuwan Kumar Pathak (Rastriya Prajatantra Party)
 Deputy Speaker of the Assembly: Hon. Apsara Chapagai Khatri (CPN (UML))
 Leader of the House (Chief Minister) : Hon. Shalikram Jamkattel (CPN (Maoist Centre))
 Leader of the Opposition: Hon. Bahadur Singh Lama (Nepali Congress)

Parliamentary party 

 Parliamentary party leader of Nepali Congress: Hon. Bahadur Singh Lama
 Parliamentary party leader of CPN (UML): Hon. Jagannath Thapaliya
 Parliamentary party leader of CPN (Maoist Centre): Hon. Shalikram Jamkattel
 Parliamentary party leader of Rastriya Prajatantra Party: Hon. Udhhav Thapa
 Parliamentary party leader of Nepal Majdoor Kisan Party: Hon. Surendra Raj Gosai
 Parliamentary party leader of Hamro Nepali Party: Hon. Shailendra Man Bajracharya

Whip 

 Chief Whip of Nepali Congress: Hon. Kundan Kafle

Composition

Members

See also 

 Bagmati Province

References

External links 

 समानुपातिक निर्वाचन प्रणाली तर्फको बागमती प्रदेश सभामा निर्वाचित सदस्यहरुको विवरण

Members of the Provincial Assembly of Bagmati Province